Park So-jin (born May 21, 1986), better known mononymously as Sojin, is a South Korean singer and actress. She is best known as the leader of South Korean girl group Girl's Day.

Early life and education
Park So-jin was born on May 21, 1986, in Daegu, South Korea. She attended Lee Hyun Elementary School, Seojin Middle School and Kyungduk Girls' High School. She majored in mechanical engineering at Yeungnam University.

Career

Pre-debut
Prior to her debut, Sojin worked as a vocal trainer for the K-pop boy band Ulala Session.

2010–2012: Debut, Flames of Desire OST and songwriting
On July 7, 2010, Sojin debuted as a member of Girl's Day on KBS' Music Bank with their debut single, "Tilt My Head" (갸우뚱).

On January 9, 2011, Sojin released her first solo single for the Flames of Desire OST, "Our Love Like This".

On April 19, 2012, Girl's Day made a comeback with the mini album Everyday II. The album included the song "Telepathy", which was composed by Sojin. On the same year, Sojin and a male composer wrote the song "It's Snowing" for Tokyo Girl. The song was later released on December 7.

2013–2016: Collaborations and Family Outing OST
On March 14, 2013, Girl's Day released the full-length album Expectation. Sojin wrote the intro song "Girl's Day World", and co-wrote the lyrics for "I Don't Mind" with her fellow members. On October 15, Girl's Day released the song "Let's Go", written and composed by Sojin.

On March 2, 2014, Sojin collaborated with hip hop artist Crucial Star on a remake of Park Hye-kyung's song "Three Things I Want to Give You".

On January 30, 2015, Sojin lent her voice for "Dizzy Dizzy" for Part 2 of her SBS' weekend drama Family Outing OST.

2017–present: Acting career
On June 24, 2020, So-jin has confirmed her appearance in MBC's 'The Spies Who Loved Me', which will be aired in October. 

On June 23, 2021, So-jin cast as the drama Alchemy of Souls. 
On September 15, 2021, So-jin cast as the main in Sh**ting Stars. On June 17, 2022, So-jin cast as the one act-drama Don't Announce Your Husband's Death as role Yoo Young-joo.

Influences
Sojin said that her biggest influence in life is Uhm Jung-hwa. She describes her as a long time leader of her generation who shows abundant expressiveness and depth.

Filmography

Film

Television series

Web series

Television show

Theater

Discography

Singles

Soundtrack appearances

Awards and nominations

References

External links 

 

1986 births
Living people
K-pop singers
South Korean female idols
South Korean women pop singers
South Korean television actresses
21st-century South Korean actresses
South Korean television personalities
South Korean dance musicians
South Korean web series actresses
Girl's Day members